Russell Morris (born 1948) is an Australian singer-songwriter.

Russell Morris may also refer to:

 Russell Morris (footballer) (born 1962), Australian rules footballer
 Russell E. Morris (born 1967), Welsh professor of structural and materials chemistry
 Russell Morris (album), a 1975 album by the Australian singer-songwriter